Orkney and Shetland is a constituency of the House of Commons of the Parliament of the United Kingdom. It elects one Member of Parliament (MP) by the first past the post system of election. In the Scottish Parliament, Orkney and Shetland are separate constituencies.
The constituency was historically known as Orkney and Zetland (an alternative name for Shetland).

In the 2014 Scottish independence referendum, 65.4% of the constituency's electors voted for Scotland to stay part of the United Kingdom.

Creation
The British parliamentary constituency was created in 1708 following the Acts of Union, 1707 and replaced the former Parliament of Scotland shire constituency of Orkney & Zetland.

Boundaries
The constituency is made up of the two northernmost island groups of Scotland, Orkney and Shetland. A constituency of this name has existed continuously since 1708. However, before 1918 the town of Kirkwall (the capital of Orkney) formed part of the Northern Burghs constituency. It is the most northerly of the 650 UK Parliament constituencies.

The constituency is one of five "protected constituencies", the others being Na h-Eileanan an Iar, two on the Isle of Wight, and Ynys Môn, defined exclusively by geography rather than by size of electorate. The constituency contains the areas of the Orkney Islands Council and the Shetland Islands Council. Before 2011 the constituency had been unique in having its boundaries protected by legislation.

The constituency has the second smallest electorate of any UK parliamentary constituency, after Na h-Eileanan an Iar.

History
The constituency has elected one Member of Parliament (MP) by the first past the post since its creation in 1707.
The constituency  has remained largely unchanged since its creation.  The town of Kirkwall was added in 1918, having previously been part of Wick Burghs.

Members of Parliament
The constituency has elected only Liberal and Liberal Democrat MPs since 1950; the longest run of any British parliamentary constituency. At each general election from 1955 until 1979, in 1987, 2010 and again in 2017 it was the safest Liberal Democrat seat in the UK. At the 2015 general election, it was the only seat in Scotland to return a Liberal Democrat MP. Two years later, in 2017, the Lib Dems gained three more seats in Scotland; increasing their Scottish seat tally to 4.

Elections

Elections in the 2010s

Elections in the 2000s

Elections in the 1990s

Elections in the 1980s

Elections in the 1970s

Elections in the 1960s

Elections in the 1950s

Elections in the 1940s

Elections in the 1930s
General election 1939–40:
Another general election was required to take place before the end of 1940. The political parties had been making preparations for an election to take place and by the Autumn of 1939, the following candidates had been selected;
Conservative: Basil Neven-Spence
Liberal: Louise Glen-Coats

Elections in the 1920s

Elections in the 1910s

Elections in the 1900s

Elections in the 1890s

Elections in the 1880s

Elections in the 1870s

 Caused by Dundas' death.

Elections in the 1860s

Elections in the 1850s

Elections in the 1840s

Elections in the 1830s

References

Further reading
F. W. S. Craig, British Parliamentary Election Results 1918 – 1949
F. W. S. Craig, British Parliamentary Election Results 1885 – 1918
F. W. S. Craig, British Parliamentary Election Results 1832 – 1885

External links

BBC Vote 2001
BBC Election 2005
Guardian Unlimited Politics
UK general elections since 1832
Politicsresources.net - Official Web Site ✔  (Election results from 1950 to the present)

Westminster Parliamentary constituencies in Scotland
Politics of Orkney
Politics of Shetland
Constituencies of the Parliament of the United Kingdom established in 1708
1708 establishments in Scotland